Dean Russel Corren (born May 16, 1955) is an American politician who served in the Vermont House of Representatives from the Chittenden 7-3 district from 1993 to 2000, as an independent and member of the Progressive Coalition. He unsuccessfully ran for lieutenant governor of Vermont in 2014. Corren was the third member of the Progressive Party elected to the state legislature.

Corren was born in New York City, and educated at Middlebury College and New York University. He was appointed to serve on the Electric Commission in Burlington, Vermont, in 1988, by the Republican and Progressive members of the city council against the wishes of the Democratic members despite Corren being a Democrat.

Corren ran for a seat in the state house in the 1990 election, but was defeated. He was elected to the state house as an independent in the 1992 election and reelected in the 1994 election. He was reelected to the state house in the 1996 and 1998 elections as a member of the Progressive Coalition. Corren ran for lieutenant governor of Vermont in the 2014 election with the nominations of the Democratic and Progressive parties, but was defeated by Republican nominee Phil Scott.

Early life and education

Dean Russel Corren was born on June 16, 1955, in New York City. Corren graduated from Middlebury College with a bachelor's degree in 1977, and later graduated with a master's degree from New York University. He married Karen Amirault.

Career

Local politics

In 1988, the Democratic member of the city council in Burlington, Vermont, wanted to appoint Richard Frothingham to the Electric Commission, but the Republican and Progressive members of the city council instead appointed Corren, who was also a member of the Democratic Party. Allen Gear, a Republican member of the city council, stated that they thought it did not matter what person was appointed to the commission as long as that person was a member of the Democratic Party. Nancy Chioffi, a Democratic member of the city council who also served as its president, stated that the "Democrats were not asking for much, and they didn't get anything" following Corren's appointment. Corren later became chair of the Electric Commission. He was appointed to serve another three year term on the council in 1991.

Corren supported Peter Clavelle during the 1993 Burlington mayoral election.

Vermont House of Representatives

Elections

Corren considered running for a seat in the Vermont House of Representatives from the Chittenden 7-3 district in the 1990 election as either an independent or Progressive Coalition candidate. He chose to run as an independent candidate, but was defeated by Democratic nominees Hamilton E. Davis and Alice Cook Bassett while coming ahead of Republican nominee June Trono. A recount was conducted and maintained Davis and Bassett's victory. During the campaign he was endorsed by the Rainbow Coalition and accused Davis, the chair of the Vermont Hospital Data Council, of using a press conference for political purposes.

Corren ran as an independent candidate in the 1992 election and was elected alongside Democratic nominee Sandy Baird and both were reelected in the 1994 election. He ran with the nomination of the Progressive Coalition in the 1996 election and won reelection alongside David Zuckerman, another member of the Progressive Coalition, and both were reelected in 1998. Corren chose to not seek reelection in the 2000 election while Zuckerman was reelected alongside Bob Kiss.

Tenure

During Corren's tenure in the state house he served on the Government Operations committee. When he joined the state house Corren was aligned with the Progressive Coalition caucus which included representatives Terry Bouricius and Tom Smith. In 1996, he sponsored legislation to impeach Judge Althea Kroger accusing her of lying under oath and making false accusation against Judge Elizabeth Gretkowski.

Lieutenant gubernatorial campaign

Corren announced on May 7, 2014, that he would run for Lieutenant Governor of Vermont with the Progressive nomination. He qualified for public campaign funds, with $50,000 in the primary and $150,000 in the general election, after raising over $18,000 with contributions below $50 which was more than the $15,000 required. On August 16, Corren launched his campaign at an event hosted by Jerry Greenfield and Ben Cohen. Corren won the Democratic primary without opposition and the Progressive primary as a write-in candidate. The Vermont Democratic State Committee voted thirty-one to four in favor of endorsing Corren on September 20, although the party did not give him access to voter lists. He participated in a debate against Republican nominee Phil Scott and Liberty Union nominee Marina Brown. Scott defeated Corren in the general election. Corren considered running for lieutenant governor or governor in the 2016 election, but chose not to.

Corren's campaign sent out a text message asking for people to vote for him using a list of people that included those who had not opted in to receive the message which was illegal. In 2015, William Sorrell, the Vermont Attorney General, filed a lawsuit against Corren $72,000 in penalties alleging that he had violated campaign financing laws by asking for the Democratic Party to send an email supporting him to their 19,000 member list. T. J. Donovan succeeded Sorrell as Attorney General and dismissed the charges against Corren stating that it would be unfair to continue the prosecution and the chilling effect it had on candidates seeking public campaign financing.

Political positions

Corren voted in favor of legislation to prohibit smoking in public areas. In 1993, the state house voted eighty to fifty-six, with Corren against, in favor of a one percent sales tax increase suggested by Howard Dean. He opposed the North American Free Trade Agreement and attempted to have a majority of the Vermont legislator go on record against the treaty. He supported the creation of a single-payer healthcare. The state house voted seventy-nine to sixty-eight, with Corren in favor, in favor of allowing civil unions for same-sex couples.

Electoral history

References

External links
 Official campaign website

Vermont Progressive Party politicians
Middlebury College alumni
New York University alumni
Tidal power
1955 births
Living people
People from Katonah, New York
American chief technology officers